Carmen-Maja Antoni (born 23 August 1945, in Berlin) is a German actress.

Life
Carmen-Maja Antoni was born into the chaos that followed the  Second World War.   Her father, Pedro Antoni, was an artist who left the family scene soon after she was born, leaving the baby with her mother, Ursula Antoni-Orendt, an "all-round artist" who later became a production director with the DFF, East Germany's national broadcasting corporation.   Carmen-Maja made her camera debut at the age of eleven, as one of the three "Blue Streaks" in a Young Pioneer Cabaret programme on national television.

By the time of the successful completion of her final school exams she had already negotiated her way through the admissions process for the Konrad Wolf Film University of Babelsberg in the Babelsberg quarter of Potsdam.   On joining, she became the academy's youngest student.   As soon as she had completed her studies she was hired by Potsdam's Hans Otto Theatre.   Still aged only 18, it was here that in 1964 she appeared as an exceptionally young "Grusche", the heroine in "The Caucasian Chalk Circle" by Bertolt Brecht.   Her performance drew praise from Brecht's widow and from Brecht's old friend, the composer Paul Dessau.  She later took the part of "Minna" in Lessings's "Minna von Barnhelm".   By 1970 Carmen-Maja Antoni had moved on to the People's Theatre in the centre of Berlin.

She has been a member of the Berliner Ensemble Theatre Company since 1976, and has recently (2005) appeared there as the lead protagonist in "Mother Courage and Her Children".  Over the years she has played in a very large number of stage plays and films, and her unmistakable voice has also been heard in various radio plays.   In addition, she teaches at the Konrad Wolf Film and Television Academy in Babelsberg.

Antoni built her career in the German Democratic Republic during the decades of German division, but following reunification hers has become a well-known television presence across German-speaking central Europe thanks in part to her appearances in the long-running (1994–2013) ZDF crime drama series Rosa Roth in which she played Karin von Lomanski, a close colleague of Police Commissioner Rosa Roth.

Filmography

 1959: Diebe im Warenhaus (TV film)
 1965: Der Reserveheld
 1965: The Rabbit Is Me
 1965: Denk bloß nicht, ich heule
 1965: Das Glück der Maria H. (TV film)
 1966:  (unfinished)
 1967: Das Mädchen an der Orga Privat (TV film)
 1967: Kleiner Mann – was nun? (TV film)
 1968: 
 1968: Hauptmann Florian von der Mühle
 1968: Ways across the Country (TV miniseries)
 1969: Zeit zu leben
 1970:  (TV film)
 1970:  1970: Unsere Klasse, große Klasse (TV film)
 1970: Zeit der Störche 1970: Zwei Briefe an Pospischiel (TV film)
 1970: Der Staatsanwalt hat das Wort: Außenseiter (TV series)
 1971: Rottenknechte (TV miniseries)
 1971: Pygmalion XII. (TV film)
 1972:  1972: Eolomea (Robot voice)
 1973: Wenn die Tauben steigen (TV film)
 1973: Der kaukasische Kreidekreis (TV film)
 1973:  1974: Johannes Kepler 1974: Nachtasyl (TV film)
 1974: Der Staatsanwalt hat das Wort: Schwester Martina 1975:  1975: Heute ist Freitag (TV film)
 1975: Der Staatsanwalt hat das Wort: Geschiedene Leute 
 1975: 
 1977: Auftrag: Überleben (TV film)
 1978: Zwerg Nase (TV film)
 1979: 
 1979: Herr Puntila und sein Knecht Matti (TV film)
 1980: 
 1980: 
 1980: Meines Vaters Straßenbahn (TV film)
 1981: 
 1981: 
 1981: Jegor Bulytschow und die anderen (TV film)
 1982: Der Hase und der Igel (TV film)
 1983: Es geht einer vor die Hunde (TV film)
 1983: Der kaukasische Kreidekreis (TV film)
 1984: Eine schöne Bescherung (TV film)
 1985: Die Gänse von Bützow
 1985: Schauspielereien, episode: Balancen (TV series)
 1986: Der junge Herr Siegmund (TV film)
 1986: Jungfer Miras Mirakel (TV film)
 1986: Plumps (Segment of TV Series, voice only, animated by Gerhard Behrendt)
 1987: 
 1987: Kindheit
 1988: Polizeiruf 110: Eifersucht (TV series)
 1988: Jeder träumt von einem Pferd (TV film)
 1988: Gabriel, komm zurück (TV film)
 1989: 
 1989: Polizeiruf 110: Der Wahrheit verpflichtet 
 1990: Heimsuchung (TV film)
 1991: Der kleine Herr Friedemann (TV film)
 1991:  1991: Ein kleiner Knall am Nachmittag (TV film)
 1993: : Die Narbe des Himmels (TV series)
 1993: Polizeiruf 110: Tod im Kraftwerk 
 1994: Polizeiruf 110: Arme Schweine 
 1994: Hate in the Head (TV film)
 1994: Rosa Roth: In Liebe und Tod (TV series)
 1995:  (TV film)
 1995: Mein heißgeliebter Führer. Liebesbriefe an Adolf Hitler (TV film)
 1995: Rosa Roth: Lügen 
 1996: Rosa Roth: Verlorenes Leben 
 1996: Refuge (TV film)
 1996: Katrin und Wladimir (TV film)
 1996: Rosa Roth: Nirgendwohin 
 1996: Rosa Roth: Montag, 26. November 
 1996: Das Leben ist eine Baustelle
 1997: Rosa Roth: Die Stimme 
 1997: Rosa Roth: Berlin 
 1997: Tatort: Der Tod spielt mit (TV series)
 1998: Move on up (TV)
 1998:  (TV film)
 1999: Wohin mit den Witwen
 1999: Nightshapes 1999: In aller Freundschaft (TV series, episode: Die Geister, die ich rief)
 1999: Medicopter 117 – Jedes Leben zählt (TV series, episode: Die falsche Maßnahme) 1999: Klemperer – Ein Leben in Deutschland (TV series, episode: Küss mich in der Kurve)
 1999: Die Hochzeitskuh
 2001: Berlin is in Germany
 2001: 
 2001: Inas Geburtstag
 2001:  2002:  2002: Brüder (TV film)
 2003: Ein Schiff wird kommen
 2003: Rosa Roth: Das leise Sterben des Kolibri 
 2004: Land's End (TV film)
 2004: Rosa Roth: Freundeskreis 
 2005: Die Boxerin
 2005: Rosa Roth: Flucht nach vorn 
 2005: Rosa Roth: Im Namen des Vaters 
 2006: Rosa Roth: In guten Händen 
 2007: Rosa Roth: Der Tag wird kommen 
 2007: Krauses Fest (TV film)
 2008: The Reader 2009: The White Ribbon 2009:  (TV film)
 2009: Krauses Kur (TV film)
 2009: Baby frei Haus (TV film)
 2010: Rosa Roth: Das Angebot des Tages 
 2010:  (TV film)
 2011: Crime Scene Cleaner 
 2011: Holger sacht nix (TV film)
 2011: Krauses Braut (TV film)
 2011: Das Kindermädchen (TV film)
 2013: Rosa Roth: Der Schuss 
 2013: Doc meets Dorf 2014: Die letzte Instanz
 2014: Mord mit Aussicht (TV series, 3rd set)
 2014: Krauses Geheimnis (TV film)

Radio plays

 2003: Dylan Thomas: Under Milk Wood (2nd neighbour) – Producer: Götz Fritsch (Hörspiel – MDR)
 2011: Jenny Reinhardt: Lina, König Faunfaun und der Bart des Katers – Regie: Klaus-Michael Klingsporn (Kinderhörspiel – DKultur)
 2012: Judith Stadlin/Michael van Orsouw: Buus Halt Waterloo - Regie: Regine Ahrem/Judith Stadlin (RBB)
 2012: Inka Bach/Ingrun Aran: Schönes Wochenende (Sie) – Regie: Ingrun Aran (Hörspiel – RBB)

Awards and prizes
 1974: Critics' Prize of the Berliner Zeitung: Best Actress of the year for the role of "Eva" in Herr Puntila und sein Knecht Matti
 1975: Critics' Prize of the Berliner Zeitung: Best Actress of the year for the role of Herakes in Herakes V by Heiner Müller
 1987: Critics' Prize Best Actress of the year for the role of Grandmother in Kindheit
 1988: Critics' Prize of the Berliner Zeitung: Best Actress of the year for the role of the Mother in Baal
 1988: 5th National Film Festival of the GDR: National film prize for the best lead actress for the film Kindheit
 1989: Art Prize of the German Democratic Republic for her complete artistic output
 1990: Helene Weigel Medal For the role of Mother-in-law in Der Selbstmörder
 2008: German Critics' Prize

References

External links
 
 
 DEFA-Sternstunden
 Biographie auf film-zeit.de
 "Wer hat Angst vor der Antoni?", Die Zeit, Januar 2000, Nr. 3, Portrait

Actresses from Berlin
20th-century German actresses
21st-century German actresses
German stage actresses
German film actresses
German television actresses
German radio actresses
1945 births
Living people